Pedro José Sevilla Yturralde was a Peruvian colonel who was the head of the 3rd Cazadores del Rímac Regiment, as well as one of the main commanders of the Battle of El Manzano of the Lima campaign during the War of the Pacific before being captured and imprisoned in Chile for the remainder of the war.

Biography

Early years 
Sevilla began his military education by studying in Chile at the College of Mora and was a classmate of Antonio Varas.

Benjamín Vicuña Mackenna mentioned that:

War of the Pacific 
In the Battle of El Manzano, Colonel Yturralde and Colonel Victorino Arceniega defended the moats and ramparts of Herbay with unusual tenacity and only at five o'clock in the morning on December 19, 1880, did they abandon their defenses and headed to Cañete.

Sevilla retired to the town of Mala, where he received orders by telegraph to move to the nearby town of Calango and, with the aid of the militia, harass the Chilean occupants.

Seville communicated the news to Nicolás de Piérola, stating:

The second and third telegrams border on military fantasy that does not withstand further historical analysis. The second marks 11:50 pm on the 19th and the third marks 4 pm on the 20th. The only certain thing about them is that they have taken prisoner Soldier Estanislao Carrizo from the " Grenadiers on Horseback" Regiment .

The newspaper of Lynch's march says that: "Colonels Arceniega and Pedro José Sevilla have fled with their forces heading for Lima through the Ants, that is, through Cañete inside".

The same text clarified the casualties to date of the Seville Division: "We have only had five dead men, who got sick before fleeing, 14 wounded and 3 horses also dead"

On December 22, Sevilla's forces approached the Chilean forces at the Hacienda de Bujama. Linea's 3rd "Cazadores del Rímac" Regiment, together with the Montoneros forces, ambushed the dense alleys of tropical scrub. While they were hidden, they let the enemy horsemen advance, who camped and even unsaddled, and only when they saw that not a single enemy soldier remained mounted did they open fire.

For his part, the commander of the Chilean force comments

Sevilla then established an outpost in a dominant spot that was able to overlook the area from a higher ground. When the Chilean infantrymen finally charged into the bushes where Colonel Joaquin Retes's montoneros and the 3rd Hunters del Rimac Regiment were taking cover, which in the act of seeing the enemy assault, retreated.

On December 23 there were only minor skirmishes with gunfire from a distance. Paz Soldan stated that:

Colonel Pedro José Sevilla Yturralde, who continued to harass the 1st Lynch Brigade on its march north, was finally ordered by Dictator Piérola to withdraw to Lima, before being overwhelmed by the enemy with his regiment.

Given the circumstances, Colonel Sevilla decides to go through the foot of the mountains to the Lurin Valley, to enter Lima through Cieneguillas. He has been badly warned that Peruvian troops are occupying the valley and especially defending the Lurín River. In Chilca , he knows that the Chileans are preparing to disembark, so he runs to the right to the town of Calango , 23 km from the coast, Valle de Mala , in search of the Cieneguillas road through the mountains. Paz Soldan wrote: 

After the Battle of El Manzano, Sevilla would be held prisoner until the end of the war and died on August 9, 1892 due to an outbreak of influenza at Lima.

References

1815 births
1892 deaths
Peruvian military leaders
Peruvian military personnel of the War of the Pacific
People from Piura
Peruvian Army officers